Hanikatsi laid (meaning 'Apple Island') is an islet in Estonia, in the Baltic Sea, south east of Hiiumaa island.  It has a surface area of 83 hectares and no permanent habitation. The islet belongs to Hiiu County, Pühalepa Parish and is part of Hiiumaa Islets Landscape Reserve, which in turn is part of West Estonian Archipelago Biosphere Reserve. 

The flora of Hanikatsi is rich, and over 400 species have been found. There are also records of 117 species of lichens. In the northern part of the islet there lies the 12-hectare Lepana broad-leaved forest, rich in species. In the southern part there are mostly birch, poplar and juniper forests. 

There are records of habitation of the islet from 1623.  The last inhabitant left the islet in 1964. There are still some buildings on the islet which have been renovated by the Landscape Reserve and are now used by scientists. 

Many people originating from the islet have the family name Hanikat.

See also
List of islands of Estonia

References

External links 
Map of Hanikatsi

Estonian islands in the Baltic
Hiiumaa Parish